Sharron Matthews is a Canadian actress. She is most noted for her regular role as Flo Chakowitz in the television series Frankie Drake Mysteries, for which she received Canadian Screen Award nominations for Best Supporting Actress in a Drama Series at the 7th Canadian Screen Awards in 2019 and the 9th Canadian Screen Awards in 2021.

Career 
Matthews is predominantly a stage actress, most notably touring her own one-woman cabaret show Girl Crush in 2017. In 2021 Matthews had her first credit as a television writer, cowriting the Frankie Drake Mysteries episode "Life Is a Cabaret".

Personal life 
A native of Hamilton, Ontario, she was married to musical theatre actor George Masswohl, but they are divorced.

Filmography

Film

Television

References

External links

20th-century Canadian actresses
21st-century Canadian actresses
Canadian film actresses
Canadian stage actresses
Canadian television actresses
Canadian musical theatre actresses
Canadian television writers
Living people
Year of birth missing (living people)
Canadian women television writers